Aspidoscelis deppii, known commonly as the blackbelly racerunner, is a species of lizard in the family Teiidae. The species is native to Central America and southern Mexico. There are three recognized subspecies.

Etymology
The specific name, deppii, is in honor of German naturalist Ferdinand Deppe.

Geographic range
A. deppii is found in Costa Rica, El Salvador, Guatemala, Honduras, Mexico (Chiapas, Guerrero, Jalisco, Michoacán, Morelos, Oaxaca), and Nicaragua.

Habitat

Reproduction
A. deppii is oviparous.

Subspecies
Three subspecies are recognized as being valid, including the nominotypical subspecies.
Aspidoscelis deppii infernalis 
Aspidoscelis deppii deppii 
Aspidoscelis deppii schizophorus 

Nota bene: A trinomial authority in parentheses indicates that the subspecies was originally described in a genus other than Aspidoscelis.

References

Further reading
Duellman WE, Wellman J (1960). "A Systematic Study of the Lizards of The Deppei [sic] Group (Genus Cnemidophorus) in Mexico and Guatemala". Miscellaneous Publications, Museum of Zoology, University of Michigan (111): 1-80 + Plate I. (Cnemidophorus deppei infernalis, new subspecies, pp. 32–35, 75, Figures 11 D-F + Plate I, top).
Martínez-Fonseca JG, Reid FA, Sunyer J (2016). "Aspidoscelis deppii (Wiegmann, 1834). Diet". Mesoamerican Herpetology 3 (2): 480-481.
Smith HM, Brandon RA (1968). "Data Nova Herpetologica Mexicana ". Transactions of the Kansas Academy of Science 71 (1): 49-61. (Cnemidophorus deppei schizophorus, new subspecies, p. 55).
Wiegmann AFA (1834). Herpetologia Mexicana, seu descriptio amphibiorum Novae Hispaniae, quae itineribus comitis de Sack, Ferdinandi Deppe et Chr. Guil. Schiede in Museum Zoologicum Berolinense pervenerunt. Pars prima, saurorum species amplectens. Adiecto systematis saurorum prodromo, additisque multis in hunc amphibiorum ordinem observationibus. Berlin: C.G. Lüderitz. vi + 54 pp. + Plates I-X. (Cnemidophorus deppii, new species, p. 28). (in Latin).

deppii
Reptiles described in 1834
Taxa named by Arend Friedrich August Wiegmann